Piotr Czech (born August 17, 1986) is a former American football placekicker. He was signed by the Baltimore Ravens as an undrafted free agent in 2008. He played college football at Wagner College.

Czech was raised in Keyport, New Jersey and played high school football at Keyport High School.

Czech was also a member of the Pittsburgh Steelers and New York Sentinels.

References

External links
Just Sports Stats
Pittsburgh Steelers bio
United Football League bio

1986 births
Living people
People from Oleśnica
People from the Province of Lower Silesia
People from Keyport, New Jersey
Polish players of American football
American football placekickers
Wagner Seahawks football players
Baltimore Ravens players
Pittsburgh Steelers players
New York Sentinels players
Iowa Barnstormers players
Sportspeople from Lower Silesian Voivodeship